Simonstone is a civil parish in Ribble Valley, Lancashire, England.  It contains 22 listed buildings that are recorded in the National Heritage List for England.  All of the listed buildings are designated at Grade II, the lowest of the three grades, which is applied to "buildings of national importance and special interest".  The parish contains the village of Simonstone and surrounding countryside.  The listed buildings are almost all houses and associated structures, or farmhouses and farm buildings, the others being a milestone and a former toll house.

Buildings

References

Citations

Sources

Lists of listed buildings in Lancashire
Buildings and structures in Ribble Valley